{{DISPLAYTITLE:C22H22O11}}
The molecular formula C22H22O11 (molar mass: 462.40 g/mol, exact mass: 462.1162 u) may refer to:

 Azalein, a flavonol
 Tectoridin, an isoflavone

Molecular formulas